Scott Parsons (born March 27, 1979 in Toledo, Ohio) is an American slalom canoeist who competed at the international level from 1994 to 2012.

Competing in three Summer Olympics, he earned his best finish of sixth in the K1 event at Athens in 2004. He finished 20th in 2008 in Beijing. At the 2012 Summer Olympics in London, he represented the United States for the third time. He finished 16th in the K1 event after being eliminated in the heats.

He qualified a US K1 slalom kayak for the 2012 Summer Olympics by finishing 15th at the 2011 World Championships, and then ensured his own qualification by finishing 11th at the 2012 Cardiff World Cup event on the 9th of June 2012.

Parsons attended St. John's Jesuit High School in Toledo, OH. His former wife Lauren Bixby was also a kayaker before she had to retire due to injury.

World Cup individual podiums

1 Pan American Championship counting for World Cup points

References

1979 births
American male canoeists
Canoeists at the 2004 Summer Olympics
Canoeists at the 2008 Summer Olympics
Canoeists at the 2012 Summer Olympics
Living people
Olympic canoeists of the United States